The National Rural Revitalization Administration is an agency within the Ministry of Agriculture and Rural Affairs of the People's Republic of China which is responsible for China's against poverty and to promote development in rural areas. It is headquartered in Beijing. It was formed on 25 February 2021 as the agency superseding the former State Council Leading Group Office of Poverty Alleviation and Development.

History
On 16 May 1986, the Office of the Leading Group for Economic Development in Poverty Stricken Areas of the State Council was created, which was reshuffled as the State Council Leading Group Office of Poverty Alleviation and Development on 17 September 1993.

On 25 February 2021, the National Rural Revitalization Administration was inaugurated. Wang Zhengpu was appointed director.

List of directors

References

2021 establishments in China
Agricultural organizations based in China
Rural development in China